Pozzolo Formigaro is a comune (municipality) in the Province of Alessandria in the Italian region Piedmont, located about  southeast of Turin and about  southeast of Alessandria.

Pozzolo Formigaro borders the following municipalities: Bosco Marengo, Cassano Spinola, Novi Ligure, Tortona, and Villalvernia.

Demographic evolution

Notable People
 Francesco Remotti, Anthropologist
 Ezia Gavazza, Professor of Modern Art History
 Monsignor Pietro Gambarotta, (7 February 1921 – 15 March 2008) Parish priest of the church of San Nicolò from 1954 to 2007.

References

Cities and towns in Piedmont